Péreille is a commune in the Ariège department in southwestern France.

Population
Inhabitants are called Péreilleois.

See also
Communes of the Ariège department
Raymond de Péreille

References

Communes of Ariège (department)
Ariège communes articles needing translation from French Wikipedia